Up and Going is a 1922 American silent adventure film directed by Lynn Reynolds and starring Tom Mix, Eva Novak and William Conklin.

Cast
 Tom Mix as David Brandon (in play)
 Eva Novak as Jackie McNabb (in play)
 William Conklin as Basil Du Bois (in play)
 Sid Jordan as Louis Patie (in play) 
 Tom O'Brien as Sergeant Langley (in play)
 Pat Chrisman as Sandy McNabb (in play)
 Paul Weigel as Father Le Claire (in play)
 Cecil Van Auker as Albert Brandon (in prologue)
 Carol Holloway as Marie Brandon (in prologue)
 Helen Field as Jacquette McNabb (in prologue)
 Marion Feducha as David Brandon (in prologue)

References

Bibliography
 Solomon, Aubrey. The Fox Film Corporation, 1915-1935: A History and Filmography. McFarland, 2011.

External links
 

1922 films
1922 adventure films
American silent feature films
American adventure films
American black-and-white films
Films directed by Lynn Reynolds
Fox Film films
1920s English-language films
1920s American films
Silent adventure films